Marie Bouzková and Vivian Heisen were the defending champions, having won the previous edition in 2019, however both players chose not to participate.

Alina Charaeva and Maria Timofeeva won the title, defeating Evgeniya Levashova and Laura Pigossi in the final, 7–6(7–5), 2–6, [10–6].

Seeds

Draw

Draw

References

External Links
Main Draw

President's Cup - Doubles
2021 Women's Doubles